Ponton Island is a small island lying 1.5 nautical miles (2.8 km) southeast of Moureaux Islands near the head of Flandres Bay, off the west coast of Graham Land. The name "Islote Solitario" appears for the feature on an Argentine government chart of 1954, but has been rejected to avoid confusion with Solitario Island at 6752S, 6826W. The island was renamed by the United Kingdom Antarctic Place-Names Committee (UK-APC) in 1960, for Mungo Ponton (1802–80), a Scottish inventor who discovered in 1839 that potassium bichromate spread on paper is light sensitive, an important landmark in the development of photography.

See also 
 List of Antarctic and sub-Antarctic islands

Islands of Graham Land
Danco Coast